H. gardneri may refer to:
 Hydrothrix gardneri, an aquatic plant species found in Brazil
 Hypoxis gardneri, a species in the genus Hypoxis

See also 
 Gardneri